Kebasen Station (KBS) is a small railway station located in Gambarsari, Kebasen, Banyumas Regency, Central Java, Indonesia.

The station sits at an elevation of +16 m (52 ft) amsl. The station is under the subdivision DAOP V Purwokerto of PT Kereta Api Indonesia (Persero).

History 
The Original station was built in 1915 by Staatsspoorwegen (SS) under The Dutch East Indies, this coincides with the opening of the Notog tunnel and the Kebasen tunnel in 1916.

Initially the old building had 3 tracks, with the second track being a passing track. However with the construction of a double track to  Station, a new building was built 200 m southeast of the previous one with an additional passing track making it having 2 passing tracks. In addition, the interlocking signal was replaced with new Len-02 electric signal by PT Len Industri while the older one were Westinghouse Westrace.

With the opening of the new double track alignment on 28 January 2019 which includes the new Kebasen tunnel and new Serayu Kebasen bridge, the old track as well as the original Notog and Kebasen tunnel were made redundant and closed soon after. These historic railway structures have since been preserved.

Services 
As of 2020, there are no trains that stop in Kebasen Station.

References

External links 

Banyumas Regency
Railway stations in Central Java
Railway stations opened in 1916